Eva Jacqueline Longoria Bastón ( Longoria; March 15, 1975) is an American actress, producer, and director. After a number of guest roles on several television series, she was recognized for her portrayal of Isabella Braña on the CBS daytime soap opera The Young and the Restless, on which she starred from 2001 to 2003. She is most known for her role as Gabrielle Solis on the ABC television series Desperate Housewives, which ran from 2004 to 2012, and for which she received Golden Globe and Screen Actors Guild Award nominations. She has also appeared in The Sentinel (2006), Over Her Dead Body (2008), For Greater Glory (2012), Frontera (2014), Lowriders (2016), and Overboard (2018). From 2015 to 2016, she starred as Ana Sofia Calderón on the short-lived NBC sitcom Telenovela, and was an executive producer for the Lifetime television series Devious Maids. She has also been an executive producer of social issue documentaries, including Food Chains and The Harvest.

Longoria has appeared in several advertising campaigns. She holds modeling contracts with L'Oréal and New York & Co, among others.

Early life and education

Eva Jacqueline Longoria was born in Corpus Christi, Texas on March 15, 1975, the youngest of the four daughters of her Mexican parents Ella Eva (Mireles) and Enrique Longoria Jr. One of her sisters had special needs. Longoria told Redbook in 2016:  She was raised Roman Catholic. She did not speak Spanish growing up, and did not learn the language until 2009.  While in high school, she worked at a Wendy's restaurant part-time for three years to help earn money for her . Longoria previously told the press how her years in fast food as a teen shaped her work ethic, saying "I couldn't wait to get to work and make my own money." Longoria earned her Bachelor of Science degree in kinesiology at Texas A&M University-Kingsville. At that time (1998), she also won the title of Miss Corpus Christi USA. After completing college, she entered a talent contest that led her to Los Angeles; and shortly thereafter, was spotted and signed by a theatrical agent. While auditioning for roles, she worked as a headhunter for four years.

After three years at California State University, Northridge, she received her master's degree in Chicano Studies in May 2013. Her thesis was "Success STEMS From Diversity: The Value of Latinas in STEM Careers".

Career
Longoria landed her first television role in 1999 after meeting executive producer Gary Ghiaey at a political reception in Los Angeles. She guest-starred in an episode of Beverly Hills, 90210. Another guest appearance on General Hospital the same year brought her big break on the CBS Daytime soap opera The Young and the Restless, where she portrayed Isabella Braña from 2001 to 2003.
After leaving that show, she appeared in the Dick Wolf revival of Dragnet. She then starred in Señorita Justice, a poorly received direct-to-video film; and a television film, The Dead Will Tell.

In 2003, Longoria was cast as Gabrielle Solis in the ABC comedy-drama Desperate Housewives. She later commented, "I think it's funny when people say I'm an overnight sensation, because I've been working at it for 10 years."
Shortly after her debut on Desperate Housewives, she starred in a direct-to-video film, Carlita's Secret, for which she was also co-producer.

In 2006, she was nominated for a Golden Globe Award for Best Performance by an Actress in a Television Series – Musical or Comedy, along with her co-stars in Desperate Housewives. That year, she received the ALMA Award, and was named entertainer of the year. She also starred opposite Michael Douglas and Kiefer Sutherland in the thriller The Sentinel (2006)—her first major role in a theatrical feature film—and played Sylvia in Harsh Times, starring Freddy Rodríguez and Christian Bale.

In the 2000s, Longoria appeared in several high-profile advertising campaigns and numerous men's magazines, reaching No. 14 in the FHM "Sexiest Women 2008" poll. She was also featured on the cover of various international women's magazines, including Vogue, Marie Claire and Harper's Bazaar. People en Español listed her among its "Most Beautiful People" for 2003. She continues to be included in lists of Hollywood's Most Beautiful. She was listed as No. 1 in Maxim's Hottest Female Stars of 2005 and 2006, the first woman to top the list in two consecutive years. She was ranked No. 9 in the magazine's Hot 100 of 2007 list. In honor of Maxim's 100th issue in 2006, she was featured on a  vinyl mesh replica of its January 2005 cover located in a Clark County, Nevada desert. More recently, she was ranked No. 14 of People's Most Beautiful 2011. People named her one of 2012 Most Beautiful at Every Age.

In January 2007, Longoria was chosen to be the first face of Bebe Sport. She appeared in the Spring/Summer 2007 campaign, photographed by Greg Kadel. She also holds contracts with L'Oréal, and New York & Co. She also contracts with Magnum Ice-Cream and Heineken. She was a part of Microsoft's "I'm A PC" ad campaign. She and Tony Parker have appeared together in campaigns for London Fog. She became a spokesperson for L'Oréal Paris in 2005 and was still being featured in L'Oréal TV commercials and print ads . In the summer of 2010, she was a judge on The Next Food Network Star; and in October, she hosted the MTV Europe Music Awards 2010 in Madrid, Spain.

Based on her earnings from June 1, 2009, to June 1, 2010, Longoria was ranked No. 4 on Forbes Prime Time's 10 Top-Earning Women with an estimated $12 million. She topped the Forbes magazine's list of the highest-paid TV actresses for 2011.

In 2013, Longoria professed that she was a "cat lady", and appeared as a spokesperson for Sheba Cat Food.

From 2013, she served as one of the executive producers of Devious Maids and directed the season two premiere, "An Ideal Husband". In 2016, she also starred in the fourth season, in the episode "Once More Unto the Bleach". She is also an executive producer of the documentaries The Harvest and Food Chains, for which she won a James Beard Foundation Award.

In 2015, NBC announced plans for a sitcom called Telenovela in which Longoria starred as a popular telenovela actress. It was filmed with a single camera. It ran for only one season.

In 2017, Longoria directed the season three finale episode of the ABC comedy Black-ish.

In 2018, Longoria attended the premiere for her new film, Dog Days with co-stars Vanessa Hudgens (Tara) and Nina Dobrev (Elizabeth) on August 5, 2018.

As of 2021, Longoria has been working with Kenya Barris on a possible new television series Brown-ish about a Latino family.

Other ventures

In March 2008, Longoria opened the restaurant Beso (which means "kiss" in Spanish) in Hollywood, along with partner and celebrity chef Todd English. The restaurant is located on Hollywood Boulevard and is accompanied by Kiss, a Victorian-themed nightclub on the floor above. The Hollywood Beso was scheduled to be the focus of a pilot episode for a tentative reality series called Beso: Waiting on Fame, to air on VH1 in late 2010.
In 2009, Longoria and various investor-partners opened a Beso restaurant, with a nightclub called Eve above it, in the Crystals retail and entertainment district of CityCenter in Las Vegas.

In 2011, the corporation Beso LLC, owner of the Vegas restaurant-and-nightclub venture, with listed assets of about $2.5 million and Longoria as a 32 percent shareholder, filed for Chapter 11 protection, entering bankruptcy proceedings, in order to restructure nearly $5.7 million in debt and other liabilities. On July 28, 2011, the U.S. Bankruptcy Court for Nevada ordered Longoria to appear in Las Vegas on August 20 in order to be examined about the bankrupt restaurant's finances.

Her first book, Eva's Kitchen: Cooking with Love for Family and Friends, was published in April 2011. In terms of food-related promotions, in 2012 and 2013, Longoria paired with Iron Chef Michael Symon for a promotion for PepsiCo's Lay's potato chips contest called "Do Us A Flavor". The promotion encourages consumers to submit new flavor ideas and fans to vote for their favorite on Facebook. The person who creates the winning flavor is awarded $1 million or one percent of chip flavor's net sales.

In 2015, Longoria announced that she had teamed up with sportswear manufacturer Sunrise Brands to create a women's apparel collection, set to launch Fall 2016.

In August 2016, Longoria's production company, UnbeliEVAble Entertainment, signed a two-year first-look deal with Universal Pictures. In September 2020, her company renewed a three-year first-look deal with 20th Television.

In March 2017, Longoria launched her clothing line website on her official site.

Philanthropy

In 2006, Longoria founded Eva's Heroes, a charity which helps young adults with developmental disabilities. The organization is located in San Antonio, Texas and was inspired by her sister who has intellectual disabilities.

She is the national spokesperson for PADRES Contra El Cancer. She signed shoes for the Spirit of Women Red Shoe Celebrity Auction. Longoria also supports the Clothes Off Our Back Foundation, OmniPeace, the National Center for Missing and Exploited Children, the National Stroke Association, Project HOME and St. Jude Children's Research Hospital. Longoria is an executive producer of Shine Global Inc.'s documentary The Harvest which is focused on the 500,000 child migrant farm workers in the U.S. and promote awareness and support to enact the Children's Act for Responsible Employment (CARE Act).

Her other charity, the Eva Longoria Foundation aims to close the education gap plaguing Latinas and confront Latino poverty. She has stated that, "The Eva Longoria Foundation supports programs which help Latinas excel in school and attend college. Additionally, we work to provide Latina entrepreneurs with career training, mentorship, capital and opportunity." The foundation offers nine-week "parent engagement" courses to help Latino parents and has a mentorship program for Latinas and other extracurricular activities as well as loans to help Latina-owned businesses. It is co-funded by philanthropist Howard Buffett son of investor Warren Buffett.

Longoria was named Philanthropist of the Year in 2009 by The Hollywood Reporter for 'her commitment to Latino causes and giving back to the community. She appeared on Fort Boyard in 2009, helping attract more than €20,000 for the Make-A-Wish Foundation.

In 2009, Longoria enrolled in a Master's program in Chicano Studies and political science at Cal State University, Northridge. According to Longoria, "because of my involvement with the NCLR and my charity work, I really wanted a better, more authentic understanding of what my community has gone through so I can help create change." She graduated with a master's degree in Chicano Studies in May 2013.

In September 2009, Longoria was appointed to a bi-partisan commission called to determine to establish a National Museum of the American Latino. In October 2012, Longoria spoke at the McAfee Focus 2012 event, where the "theme of safety—beyond computers—emerged. Safety involving financial security, emotional security, and the other results from Longoria's philanthropic efforts."

In March 2017, Longoria was listed by UK-based company Richtopia at number 42 in the list of 200 Most Influential Philanthropists and Social Entrepreneurs Worldwide.

In July 2019, Longoria supported the Special Olympics Texas Summer Games hosted by Toyota Field and Morgan's Wonderland in San Antonio, Texas. The following year, she also assisted the San Antonio Food Bank with their COVID relief efforts.

Politics and activism
Longoria has a keen interest in immigration. She accompanied a border patrol in Arizona and has immersed herself in the issues to understand the Mexican and the U.S. points of view. She has described Arizona's SB 1070 immigration law as unconstitutional.

In 2012, Longoria was one of seven Californians named to the post of co-chair of Barack Obama's reelection campaign. On September 6, she spoke at the 2012 Democratic National Convention where she endorsed President Obama's reelection. In May 2014, she initiated the Latino Victory Project to raise funds for candidates and efforts to get out the vote. An executive producer of the documentaries The Harvest and Food Chains, she is a supporter of the Coalition of Immokalee Workers.

In 2014, Longoria endorsed Marianne Williamson for California's 33rd congressional district. In 2018, Longoria endorsed Beto O'Rourke for Senate against incumbent Senator Ted Cruz, as well as Collin Allred for Texas's 32nd congressional district against then-incumbent Rep. Pete Sessions.

Longoria spoke at the 2016 Democratic National Convention in Philadelphia on July 26, 2016. In August 2020, she hosted the first night of the 2020 Democratic National Convention, which was held remotely because of the COVID-19 pandemic.

In preparation of Georgia's runoff elections, on January 2, 2021, Longoria participated in a VoteRiders textbanking event with America Ferrera to help educate Latina voters regarding the state's voter ID laws.

Personal life

Marriages and children

Longoria was married to actor Tyler Christopher, star of General Hospital, from 2002 to 2004.

Longoria met Tony Parker, then the point guard for the San Antonio Spurs, in November 2004. On November 30, 2006, the couple became engaged. They married in a civil service on July 6, 2007, at a Paris city hall. They had a Catholic wedding ceremony at the Saint-Germain l'Auxerrois Church in Paris on July 7, 2007. On November 17, 2010, Longoria filed for divorce from Parker in Los Angeles, citing "irreconcilable differences". In the divorce petition, Longoria requested that her family name be restored. She also sought spousal support from Parker. The couple had a prenuptial agreement that was signed in June 2007, a month before their wedding, and amended two years later in June 2009.

Longoria told her friend Mario Lopez she had discovered hundreds of text messages from another woman on her husband's phone. Extra identified the other woman as Erin Barry, the then-wife of Brent Barry, Parker's former teammate, and revealed that the Barrys also were in the process of divorcing. In light of the divorce, Longoria canceled her scheduled appearance at the 2010 American Music Awards. On November 19, 2010, Parker filed for divorce from Longoria in Bexar County, Texas, on the grounds of "discord or conflict of personalities", thus establishing a legal battle over where the divorce case would be heard. Unlike Longoria's divorce petition, Parker's did not mention a prenuptial agreement and claimed that the parties would "enter into an agreement for the division of their estate". The divorce was finalized in Texas on January 28, 2011, the same day Longoria's lawyer filed papers to dismiss her Los Angeles petition. Longoria would later comment, "I didn't realize it at the time with Tony, but I had become my own version of a desperate housewife."

On December 13, 2015, Longoria reported her engagement to Mexican businessman José Antonio "Pepe" Bastón Patiño, then the president of Televisa, the largest media company in Latin America. Bastón and Longoria met on a blind date arranged by a mutual friend in Mexico City; at the time, Bastón did not know who Longoria was and originally declined the invitation to meet her because of his busy schedule. The couple were married in Mexico on May 21, 2016.

On December 19, 2017, it was reported that Longoria was pregnant with her first child. She gave birth to a son in 2018.

Ancestry
According to research done in 2010 by Harvard professor and  Faces of America host Henry Louis Gates Jr., Longoria's oldest identifiable Spanish immigrant ancestor is her ninth great-grandfather, Lorenzo Suárez de Longoria (b. Oviedo, 1592), who was a colonist of the Viceroyalty of New Spain (modern-day Mexico) in 1603. His family was based in a small village called Llongoria, Belmonte de Miranda, Asturias, Spain. Longoria is the Castillanized form of this Asturian-language surname.

In 1767, her seventh great-grandfather received almost  of land along the Rio Grande in a land grant from King Charles III of Spain. The family retained this land for more than a century. After the US-Mexican border was moved southwards in the aftermath of the Mexican–American War, the land ended up on the American side of the border. Her family had to deal with the influx of United States settlers following the Mexican–American War and the American Civil War.

According to DNA testing, Longoria's overall genetic ancestry is 70% European, 27% Indigenous American, and 3% African. After a computer compared the DNA results of Gates's dozen guests, tests showed that she is anciently related by human haplogroup to cellist Yo-Yo Ma, who is of Chinese heritage. As women have two X chromosomes and no Y chromosome, Longoria did not inherit her father's Y-DNA, but she did inherit her mother's mitochondrial DNA (genetic information passed from mother to child). Longoria's mtDNA belongs to the Haplogroup A2, making her a direct descendant of a Native American woman, a Maya from the territory of Mexico long before it was Mexico. Her ancestors include many other Maya on both sides of her family.
Longoria identifies as a "Texican"—a Mexican-American Texan.

Filmography

Films

Television

Music videos

Producer

Director

Awards and nominations

References

External links

 
 
 Eva Longoria Foundation
 Eva's Heroes
 Eva's Clothing Line 
 Full Q&A Oxford Union
 

20th-century American actresses
21st-century American actresses
1975 births
Activists from California
Activists from Texas
Actresses from San Antonio
American actresses of Mexican descent
American beauty pageant winners
American chief executives of food industry companies
American cookbook writers
American cosmetics businesspeople
American female models
American film actresses
American humanitarians
Women humanitarians
American philanthropists
American political activists
American political women
American restaurateurs
Women restaurateurs
American soap opera actresses
American social activists
American television actresses
American television directors
American voice actresses
Television producers from California
American women television producers
American women in business
American writers of Mexican descent
Businesspeople from Los Angeles
Businesspeople from Texas
California Democrats
California people in fashion
California State University, Northridge alumni
Education activists
Hispanic and Latino American actresses
Living people
Nightclub owners
People from Corpus Christi, Texas
People from San Antonio
People of Maya descent
Philanthropists from California
Texas A&M University–Kingsville alumni
Texas Democrats
Women cookbook writers
American women television directors
Writers from Los Angeles
Writers from San Antonio
American women non-fiction writers
Catholics from Texas
Television producers from Texas
American women chief executives
American people of Mexican descent